Charlotte Sterry defeated Agnes Morton 6–4, 6–4 in the all comers' final to win the ladies' singles tennis title at the 1908 Wimbledon Championships. The reigning champion May Sutton did not defend her title. She was the oldest ladies' singles champion, at 37 years and 282 days.

Draw

All comers' finals

Top half

Bottom half

References

External links

Women's Singles
Wimbledon Championship by year – Women's singles
Wimbledon Championships - Singles
Wimbledon Championships - Singles